True Story is the only album by American hip hop duo B.G.'z, released on July 29, 1995, by Cash Money. The B.G.'z, formed in 1995, were a group consisting of "Lil Doogie" (B.G.), who was 14 years old, and "Baby D" (Lil Wayne), who was 12. The album was re-released in 1999 as a B.G. album, when Cash Money Records got a distribution deal with Universal Records. It sold over 20,000 copies at the time of its release.

"True Story" and "F*ck Big Boy" are diss tracks towards rapper Mystikal and Big Boy Records, another independent label from New Orleans, Louisiana.

Track listing
 All songs are produced by Mannie Fresh.

References

1995 debut EPs
Albums produced by Mannie Fresh
Cash Money Records EPs
Gangsta rap EPs
Bounce music albums